Derbyshire County Cricket Club in 1919 was the first cricket season after a four-year break from first class cricket during World War I. The English club  Derbyshire had been playing for forty-eight years. It was their twenty first season in the County Championship and they won three matches in the County Championship to come ninth.

1919 season
 
After the First World War, county cricket resumed in 1919 but everyone connected with the game had to put in much effort to create a very basic competition. Matches were restricted to two days to begin with, but the experiment was not repeated. Derbyshire played 14 matches in the County Championship and one against the Australian Imperial Forces. Derbyshire struggled to create a team, drawing in several youngsters, and also calling upon players who had last represented the club years previously. As a result, they managed three wins in the County Championship and  four matches altogether - their particular accomplishment was to defeat the Australian Imperial Forces XI, Derbyshire being the only county side to do so.

Richard Baggallay had been the last captain before the war and he led the team in the resumption of the game although he only played in three matches. John Chapman was the most frequent substitute. Leonard Oliver was top scorer  and Billy Bestwick took most wickets with 89. Bestwick had made his debut for Derbyshire in 1898; he had not played for them since 1909 and had a reputation for unreliability on account of taste for beer. He was brought back into the team in 1919 at the age of 43,  with Arthur Morton as his minder. Although it was thought he would be past first-class cricket his capability surprised everybody. The 36 runs victory over  the Australians was achieved without Bestwick, who, was making his first appearance for the Players against the Gentlemen at Lord's. James Horsley managed a hat-trick, and with Arthur Morton shared nineteen wickets in the two Australian innings. George Beet stepped in behind the stumps, bridging the gap between the stalwarts Joe Humphries and Harry Elliott.

The season marked the beginning of Guy Jackson's long association with the club. Other new players included the Hill-Woods - Basil and Wilfred, Arthur Severn, Louis Flint, Geoffrey Bell and William Malthouse. In addition George Ratcliffe made his single appearance for Derbyshire against the Australians, and  John Dunlop Southern made the first of his occasional appearances, also against the Australians.

Matches

Statistics

County Championship batting averages

County Championship bowling averages

Wicket Keeper

G Beet Catches 25,  Stumping 7

Derbyshire County Cricketers  in the Great War

Casualties
Frank Bingham played one match for Derbyshire in the 1896 season He was a doctor and an enthusiastic Territorial Army officer, and in the First World War served as a combatant rather than as a military doctor. He was a lieutenant in the 5th Battalion, King's Own Royal Regiment (Lancaster) and became a captain in 1914 and commanded a company. He took part in the Second Battle of Ypres and was killed on 22 May 1915 on a reconnaissance mission after stopping to dig a man out of a collapsed trench. He is commemorated on the Menin Gate.
Geoffrey Jackson played for Derbyshire from 1912 to 1914, and for Oxford University in 1914. He was given a commission in the Rifle Brigade on the outbreak of World War I and went to France in October, 1914. He was invalided home, after the Second Battle of Ypres, suffering from gas poisoning and spent some months in England serving his Reserve Battalion. He returned to France, as Adjutant of the 1st Battalion, in December, 1915, and was Mentioned in Despatches on 1 January 1916. He served continuously until his death on 9 April 1917 at the Battle of Arras. He was mortally wounded by a piece of shell after advancing about 6000 yards, and died at Faimpoux, Arras, Belgium before reaching the dressing station.
Charles Newcombe played one first-class cricket match for Derbyshire in 1910, and also played league football for Chesterfield F. C. and Rotherham Town. He served in the First World War in the 7th Bn King's Own Yorkshire Light Infantry as a lieutenant and was killed in action at Fleuraix in France on 27 December 1915. He was buried at Y Farm Military Cemetery, Bois-Grenier
Guy Wilson played one first class match for Derbyshire in 1902 and one in 1905. He was killed in action during the Battle of Cambrai on 30 November 1917.

Awards

RRC Baggallay  served in the Irish Guards and was successively captain and major, seeing service at the Somme and Ypres. He was mentioned in despatches and awarded D.S.O. and M.C.  in 1919.
GR Jackson served as a captain at Salonica in January 1918,and was awarded the Military Cross. He was also mentioned in despatches twice and also won the French Legion d’Honneur and the Greek Military Cross. Jackson was leading his troops on patrol when some Bulgarian soldiers approached, carrying a flag of truce. They were asking for the armistice which was to end Bulgaria’s part in the First World War.
GF Bell  won the Military Cross.

See also
Derbyshire County Cricket Club seasons
1919 English cricket season
Cricket in the Great War

References

1919 in English cricket
Derbyshire County Cricket Club seasons
English cricket seasons in the 20th century